This Narrow Road is the 30th album by Jandek, and the first of two new discs (there were several reissues) released in 2001. It is also the second of three (so far) spoken word releases and is Corwood #0768.

Track listing

References

External links
 Seth Tisue's This Narrow Road review

Jandek albums
Corwood Industries albums
2001 albums